Mykolaiv Shipyard may refer to three major shipyards in the Ukrainian city of Mykolaiv or Nikolayev. The North and South yards were also known as the Andre Marti yards in early Soviet times :

 Black Sea Shipyard - also known as Nikolayev South Shipyard, Soviet Shipyard No. 444 and Shipyard No. 198, where most of the biggest Soviet warships were built
 Shipyard named after 61 Communards (Mykolayiv Shipyard) - also known as Nikolaev North Shipyard and Soviet Shipyard No. 200, constructs smaller naval vessels
 Okean Shipyard - a merchant shipyard

 The smaller Nibulon Shipbuilding-Shiprepair Plant is operated by the Nibulon agro-logistics company.

See also
 Mykolayiv (disambiguation)